The Westmeadows Football Club is an Australian rules football club located 19 km  north west of  Melbourne in the suburb of Westmeadows and is affiliated with the Essendon District Football League.

After meetings with local community members the club was founded in 1970, as a junior club fielding Under 11's and currently fields six under-age teams.

The Senior club was established in 1977.

Westmeadows only Senior Grand Final success was in 1984 when the club defeated Ascot Vale by forty points at Windy Hill to win the B Grade premiership.

Senior Premierships  (1)
B Grade
1984.

VFL / AFL Players
 Kevin McGuire, Andrew Krakouer, Corey McKernan, Anthony Dwyer  - North Melbourne;
 Anthony McGregor - Fitzroy;
 Scott Wynd and Craig Ellis - Footscray;
 Jordan Bannister and Andrew Welsh - Essendon;
 Dane Swan - Collingwood;

External links
 EDFL Website
 Full Points Footy

Essendon District Football League clubs
1970 establishments in Australia
Australian rules football clubs established in 1970
Australian rules football clubs in Melbourne
Sport in the City of Hume